Vilkyškiai is a small town in Tauragė County, in western Lithuania. According to the 2011 census, the town has a population of 666 people.

Notable residents
 Albrecht Gustav von Manstein (1805-1877), German general
 Oskar Brüsewitz (1929–1976), East German Lutheran pastor

References

Towns in Lithuania
Towns in Tauragė County